Jaroslava Sedláčková (born 21 June 1946) is a Czech former gymnast. She won a silver medal in the team competition at the 1964 Summer Olympics. Individually she finished 7th on the balance beam, 8th on uneven bars and 11th all around.

References

External links 

 

1946 births
Living people
Czech female artistic gymnasts
Olympic gymnasts of Czechoslovakia
Gymnasts at the 1964 Summer Olympics
Olympic silver medalists for Czechoslovakia
Olympic medalists in gymnastics
People from Louny District
Medalists at the 1964 Summer Olympics
Medalists at the World Artistic Gymnastics Championships
Sportspeople from the Ústí nad Labem Region